Qazi Mardan (also Romanized as Qāẕī Mardān and Qāzī Mardān; also known as Meymardān) is a village in Darbandrud Rural District, in the Central District of Asadabad County, Hamadan Province, Iran. At the 2006 census, its population was 232, in 45 families.

References 

Populated places in Asadabad County